General of Division François Antoine Teste, Baron Teste (19 November 1775 in Bagnols-sur-Cèze – 8 December 1862 Angoulême) was a French officer during the Napoleonic Wars. He was in the French Chamber of Peers from 1839 to 1848.

Notes

References
 (Google translation)

1775 births
1862 deaths
French commanders of the Napoleonic Wars
Generals of the First French Empire
Barons of the First French Empire
Names inscribed under the Arc de Triomphe
Knights of the Order of Saint Louis
Grand Croix of the Légion d'honneur
People from Bagnols-sur-Cèze